The Scroll and Key Society is a secret society, founded in 1842 at Yale University, in New Haven, Connecticut.  It is one of the oldest Yale secret societies and reputedly the wealthiest. The society is one of the reputed "Big Three" societies at Yale, along with Skull and Bones and Wolf's Head. Each spring the society admits fifteen rising seniors to participate in its activities and carry on its traditions.

History

Scroll and Key was established by John Addison Porter, with aid from several members of the Class of 1842 (including Leonard Case Jr. and Theodore Runyon) and a member of the Class of 1843 (William L. Kingsley), after disputes over elections to Skull and Bones Society. Kingsley is the namesake of the alumni organization, the Kingsley Trust Association (KTA), incorporated years after the founding.

Lyman Hotchkiss Bagg wrote that "up until as recent a date as 1860, Keys had great difficulty in making up its crowd, rarely being able to secure the full fifteen upon the night of giving out its elections." However, the society was on the upswing: "the old order of things, however, has recently come to an end, and Keys is now in possession of a hall far superior...not only to Bones hall, but to any college-society hall in America."

Gifts to Yale
In addition to financing its own activities, Scroll and Key has made significant donations to Yale over the years. The John Addison Porter Prize, awarded annually since 1872, and in 1917 the endowment for the founding of the Yale University Press, which has funded the publication of The Yale Shakespeare and sponsored the Yale Younger Poets Series, are gifts from "Keys".

Traditions

 At the close of Thursday and Sunday sessions, members are known to sing the "Troubadour" song on the front steps of the Society's hall, a remnant of the tradition of public singing at Yale. The song (written in the 1820s by Thomas Haynes Bayly) was recorded by Tennessee Ernie Ford on his 1956 album, This Lusty Land, as "Gaily the Troubador".
 In keeping with the practice of adopting secret letters or symbols such as Skull and Bones' "322," Manuscript's "344," and the Pundits' "T.B.I.Y.T.B," Scroll and Key is known to use the letters "C.S.P. and C.C.J."
 Members of the society sign letters to each other "YiT", as opposed to Skull and Bones' "yours in 322".
 Outside of its tap-related activities, the society has been known to hold two major annual events called "Z Session".

Membership

Scroll and Key taps annually a delegation of fifteen, composed of  men and women of the junior class, to serve the following year.  Membership is offered to a diverse group of highly accomplished juniors, specifically those who have "achieved in any field, academic, extra-curricular, or personal." Delegations frequently include editors of the Yale Daily News and other publications,  artists and musicians, social and political activists, athletes of distinction, entrepreneurs, and high achieving scholars.

Mark Twain is an honorary member, under the auspices of Joseph Twichell, Yale College Class of 1859.

Architecture
 
The society's "building" was designed in the Moorish Revival style by Richard Morris Hunt and constructed in 1870.  A later expansion was completed in 1901.  Architectural historian Patrick Pinnell includes an in-depth discussion of Keys' building in his 1999 history of Yale's campus, relating the then-notable cost overruns associated with the Keys structure and its aesthetic significance within the campus landscape.  Pinnell's history shares the fact that the land was purchased from another Yale secret society, Berzelius (at that time, a Sheffield Scientific School society). In 2002, the society underwent a major construction project rumored to involve an aquarium beneath the society.

Regarding its distinctive appearance, Pinnell noted that "19th century artists' studios commonly had exotic orientalia lying about to suggest that the painter was sophisticated, well traveled, and in touch with mysterious powers; Hunt's Scroll and Key is one instance in which the trope got turned into a building." Later, undergraduates described the building as  a "striped zebra Billiard Hall" in a supplement to a Yale yearbook. More recently, it has been described by an undergraduate publication as being "the nicest building in all of New Haven.".

Notable members

See also
 Collegiate secret societies in North America

References

Secret societies at Yale
1842 establishments in Connecticut
Student organizations established in 1842
Secret societies in the United States